Cellular Textiles is an alternative way of producing textiles that is very different than both knitting & weaving.

Production
Cellular Textiles, produced using additive manufacturing, are defined by their complex interlocking parts.  A single base unit geometry is created, with variable parts.  By repeating these base units over a surface while changing their parts, textiles with varying properties can be created.

References

Textiles